Emmy Destinn (; 26 February 1878 – 28 January 1930) was a Czech operatic dramatic soprano. She had a career both in Europe and at the New York Metropolitan Opera.

Biography

Destinn was born Emílie Pavlína Věnceslava Kittlová in Prague, in what was then the Austro-Hungarian Empire.

Her voice teacher since age thirteen had been Marie von Dreger Loewe-Destinn, and the young singer began using her teacher's surname as a tribute. She was let go after the short engagement at the Dresden Opera and declined by Prague National Theatre in 1897. She debuted on 19 July 1898 at the Berlin Court Opera as Santuzza in Cavalleria rusticana. She made such progress that the intendant of the Berlin Court Opera engaged her at once when she was brought to intendant's notice. She was only nineteen at the time, but her voice and her acting soon won the Berlin public. Her engagement in Berlin lasted until 27 October 1909. She sang in 54 operas, including 12 premieres.

Her fame became international in 1901 when she was invited to sing the part of Senta in Der fliegende Holländer at Germany's Bayreuth Festspielhaus. She returned to sing the same role the next year.

Destinn made her London debut at Covent Garden's Royal Opera House on 2 May 1904, as Donna Anna in Don Giovanni. She appeared there in several operas for the next two seasons, including the London premiere of Madama Butterfly with Caruso. Her Metropolitan Opera debut came in 1908 with an acclaimed performance of Aida, after she was released from her contract with the Berlin Court Opera. Two years later at the Met, she created the role of Minnie in the premiere of Puccini's La fanciulla del West, again opposite Caruso, and under the direction of Arturo Toscanini.

While she was highly successful in the lighter roles of Wagner's operas, her spinto voice—although large in size, with a ringing top register—was better suited to German music of a less declamatory type. She also excelled in the French part of Carmen, in which she was said to rival Calvé, and in the Italian roles of Aida, Madama Butterfly and Leonora (in Il trovatore).

Destinn's career suffered a fatal blow in World War I. She returned to her homeland after the start of the war in 1914, but her links with the patriotic Czech resistance caused her passport to be revoked. She was interned at her chateau for the remainder of the conflict. By the time that she returned to the Met in 1919, her voice had become rusty and she had been replaced in the hearts of New York audiences by a new generation of singers, although she did still continue to sing with the company until 1921.

Last years and death
Destinn returned to Czechoslovakia, where she married Joseph Halsbach, a Czech air-force officer, in 1923. She retired from the stage in 1926 and died from a stroke in České Budějovice, Czechoslovakia, a month before her 52nd birthday. She is interred in the Vyšehrad cemetery in Prague.

Legacy

Her likeness appeared in 1996 on the 2,000 Czech koruna banknote. The main-belt asteroid 6583 Destinn is named after her.

Notes

References

External links 

 Biography, discography, bibliography from the Kapralova Society
 The Emmy Destinn Foundation, with a biography
 Biography by Alan Bilgora for Prima Voce
 Biography from Opera-Gems.com 

1878 births
1930 deaths
Czech operatic sopranos
Czech women writers
Czech poets
Musicians from Prague
Fonotipia Records artists
Czech women in World War I
19th-century Czech women opera singers
20th-century Czech women opera singers
Burials at Vyšehrad Cemetery